Zhongshan Wang (中山王, King/Prince of Zhongshan) may refer to:

Warring States period
King Cuo of Zhongshan (323–309 BC), fifth ruler of the state of Zhongshan

Han dynasty
Liu Sheng, Prince of Zhongshan (died 113 BC)
Liu Xing, Prince of Zhongshan (died 8 BC)
Emperor Ping of Han (9 BC – 6 AD), known as Prince of Zhongshan before he became emperor in 1 BC

Others
Xu Da (1332–1385), Ming dynasty general, posthumously honored as Zhongshan Wang